James J. Mutrie (June 13, 1851 – January 24, 1938) was an American baseball pioneer who was the co-founder and first manager of both the original New York Metropolitans and the New York Giants. He had a winning percentage of .611, the highest for the 19th century for managers. It remains the third highest by any major league manager with at least 600 wins, trailing only Joe McCarthy's mark of .615 and Dave Roberts.

Life
Mutrie, nicknamed "Smilin' Jeems" and "Truthful Jim", was born in Chelsea, Massachusetts, and grew up playing cricket, first playing baseball at age 16. He played in the minor leagues from 1877 to 1879. In 1880 he moved from New England to New York, where he obtained financial backing from August Belmont and John B. Day to start the independent New York Metropolitans. At the end of the 1882 season, Day and Mutrie accepted offers from both the American Association and the National League to enter a New York team; they met their double commitment by entering the Mets in the American Association, and acquiring most of the players from the Troy Trojans to form the New York Gothams for the National League.

Mutrie managed the New York Metropolitans from 1880-1882 in the Eastern Championship Association and League Alliance, and winning both of those leagues in 1881 and 1882 respectively. The Metropolitans' record in 1882 was 101-57-3 and they easily won the League Alliance pennant. From 1880-1882, Mutrie managed the New York Metropolitans to a 201-136-7 record. Mutrie managed the Metropolitans in 1883 and 1884, leading them to the 1884 World Series the latter year. In the 1884 World Series, Mutrie faced off against his former manager Frank Bancroft. Bancroft was the manager of the New Bedford Whalers of the New England League in 1878 when Mutrie played for the Whalers. The Whalers won the New England League pennant in 1878.

In 1885, Mutrie switched to managing the Gothams, and is credited with giving them their nickname, the Giants. With star players such as Buck Ewing, Tim Keefe and Roger Connor, the Giants won National League pennants and World Series titles under Mutrie in 1888 and 1889. Ewing, Keefe and many other players defected to the Players' League's New York Giants in 1890, and the National League Giants under Mutrie slumped to sixth and then third place. When the Giants were reorganized after the 1891 season under new ownership, Mutrie was not retained as manager.

Personal life
After leaving baseball, Mutrie operated a hotel in Elmira, New York and a newsstand on Staten Island. He died of cancer on Roosevelt Island in New York City at age 86. He was buried at the Moravian Cemetery on Staten Island.

Managerial record

References

Notes

External links

Baseball-Reference.com – managerial record
Minor League playing stats
New York Times obituary, January 25, 1938 (subscription required)

1851 births
1938 deaths
New York Metropolitans managers
New York Giants (NL) managers
Minor league baseball managers
Fall River Casscade players
New Bedford (minor league baseball) players
New Haven (minor league baseball) players
Hartford (minor league baseball) players
Worcester Grays players
New York Metropolitans (minor league) players
19th-century baseball players
Baseball players from Massachusetts
Sportspeople from Chelsea, Massachusetts
Burials at Moravian Cemetery